The Last Full Measure may refer to:

 The Last Full Measure (novel), a 1998 novel by Jeffrey Shaara 
 The Last Full Measure (2004 film), a short film written and directed by Alexandra Kerry
 The Last Full Measure (2019 film), a war drama film by Todd Robinson
 "The Last Full Measure" (short story), a short story by George Alec Effinger
 Last Full Measure (Star Trek novel), a 2006 Star Trek: Enterprise relaunch novel
The Last Full Measure (album), a 2016 album by Swedish metal band Civil War